Bielice  is a village in the administrative district of Gmina Mogilno, within Mogilno County, Kuyavian-Pomeranian Voivodeship, in north-central Poland.

In 2008 the village had a population of 292.

References

Bielice